Soft Machine are an English rock band from Canterbury formed in mid-1966. As a central band of the Canterbury scene, the group became one of the first British psychedelic acts and later moved into progressive rock and jazz fusion. Having known numerous line-ups, the band currently consists of John Marshall (drums), John Etheridge (guitar), Theo Travis (saxophone, flutes, keyboards) and Fred Baker (bass).

Discography

Studio albums

Live albums

Compilation albums

Miscellaneous albums

Other minor releases
These albums were released by small labels, and most of their content is available on the main albums listed above.

Singles
1967: "Love Makes Sweet Music/Feelin' Reelin' Squeelin'" (Line–up: Ratledge/Wyatt/Ayers/Allen) [UK/NL]
1968: "Joy of a Toy/Why Are We Sleeping?" (Line–up: Ratledge/Wyatt/Ayers) [US/JPN]
1978: "Soft Space (Part 1)/(Part 2)" (Line–up: Marshall/Jenkins/Etheridge/Sanders/Cook) [UK/Europe]

Bootlegs

The 1960s
1968
 1968, 08–11, Live at Davenport, Iowa (supporting The Jimi Hendrix Experience)
 1968, 08–16, Live at the Merryweather Post Pavilion in Columbia, Maryland (supporting The Jimi Hendrix Experience)
 1968, 09–13, Live at the Hollywood Bowl, California (supporting The Jimi Hendrix Experience)

1969
 1969, 04–13, Live at the Country Club in London
 1969, 06–25, Live at the Ba.Ta.Clan in Paris
 1969, 08–09, Live at Plumpton Race Course – only "Moon in June" was performed
 1969, 10–05, Live at the Lyceum in London
 1969, 10–28, Live at Actuel Festival in Amougies, Belgium – excerpt
 1969, 10–6–27, Live at the Liverpool University – excerpt

The 1970s
1970
 1970, 01–04, Live at the Fairfield Halls, in Croydon – This concert was published as Noisette (Cuneiform, 2000), but this official release lacks "Facelift" that was in part used for the Third album (1970), where it is joined by another version recorded 11 January and overdubbed. This concert is inserted here only because the version of "Facelift" herein contained (over 25 minutes long) is a very special version and the full song would deserve an official treatment.
 1970, 01–17, Live at the Concertgebouw in Amsterdam
 1970, 04–04, Live at the Kolner Festival, Germany
 1970, 09–01, BBC Radiophonic Workshop – Eamonn Andrews explained
 1970, 09–17, Alan Black "Sound of the Seventies" (broadcast 25 Sept.), recorded at the Camden Theatre in London
 1970, 10–24, Live at DeDoelen, Rotterdam – excerpt

1971
 1971, 02–07, Live at the Roundhouse, London, UK
 1971, 03–21, Live in Het Turfschip, Breda, Netherlands
 1971, 06–07, Live at the Cafe au Go Go (the Gaslight) in New York City
 1971, 10–17, Donaueschinger Musiktage – this concert has appeared partially on Drop (Moonjune 2008)
 1971, 11–07, Live at the Berlin Jazz Festival – there exist two versions of this concert: the live recording and the radio broadcast (with German DJ inserts) – this concert has appeared partially on Drop (Moonjune 2008).

1972
 1972, 04–22, Live at Palazzo dello Sport in Bergamo, Italy
 1972, 04–24, Live at the Piper Club in Rome – one of the last concerts with Elton Dean
 1972, 06–07, Live at King's Cross Cinema – this concert is arguably the first with Karl Jenkins
 1972, 12–03, Live at Fairfield Halls, Croydon, UK

1974
 1974, 03–11, Radio Interview with Mike Ratledge and Alan Holdsworth for an American radio broadcast
 1974, 03–13, Live at Syracuse University in Syracuse, New York
 1974, 03–17, Live at "My Father's Place" in Roslyn, New York
 1974, 03–23–24, Live at the Howard Stein's Academy of Music in New York
 1974, 08–10, Live at Le Naiadi, Pescara, Italy
 1974, 09–20–24, Villa Pamphili Festival in Rome

1975
 1975, 01–16, Live in Stuttgart, Germany
 1975, 08–17, Live at the Théâtre antique d'Orange, Orange Festival in France
 1975, 08–24, Live at the Reading Festival, UK
 1975, 08–29, Live in Vienna
 1975, 11–26, Live at the Cinéma Variétés in Marseille, France

1976
 1976, 02–18, Live at the Palasport in Reggio Emilia, Italy
 1976, 08–08, Live in Trieste, Italy
 1976, 10–09, Live in Roskilde, Copenhagen
 1976, 12–03, Live at the Palais des Sports in Paris

Related bands, projects & tributes discography

Discography

Notes

References

Discographies of British artists
Rock music discographies